The 2021 World Athletics U20 Championships, also known as the World Junior Championships, was an international athletics competition for athletes qualifying as juniors (born no earlier than 1 January 2002), which was held from 18 to 22 August 2021 at the Moi International Sports Centre in Nairobi, Kenya.

Schedule

lins wako

Qualifying Standards

Men's results

Track 

  (World U20 Record),  (World U20 Leading),  (Championships Record),  (Area U20 Record),  (National U20 Record),  (Personal Best),  (Season Best)

Field 

  (World U20 Record),  (World U20 Leading),  (Championships Record),  (Area U20 Record),  (National U20 Record),  (Personal Best),  (Season Best)

Women's results

Track 

  (World U20 Record),  (World U20 Leading),  (Championships Record),  (Area U20 Record),  (National U20 Record),  (Personal Best),  (Season Best)

Field 

  (World U20 Record),  (World U20 Leading),  (Championships Record),  (Area U20 Record),  (National U20 Record),  (Personal Best),  (Season Best)

Mixed results

Track

  (World U20 Record),  (World U20 Leading),  (Championships Record),  (Area U20 Record),  (National U20 Record),  (Personal Best),  (Season Best)

Records set 

4 world U20 records: (Sasha Zhoya (FRA) in the 110m hurdles - 12.93 semifinal and 12.72 final; Jamaica in the women’s 4x100m relay – 42.94; South Africa in the men’s 4x100m relay – 38.51).
15 championship records: (Anthony Pesela BOT in the men’s 400m - 44.58; Emmanuel Wanyonyi KEN in the men’s 800m – 1:43.76; Tadese Worku ETH in the men’s 3000m - 7:42.09; Sasha Zhoya FRA in the 110m hurdles - 12.93 and 12.72; Mykolas Alekna LTU in the men’s Discus Throw – 69.81; South Africa in the men’s 4x100m – 38.51; Christine Mboma NAM 22.41 semifinal, Beatrice Masiilingi NAM 22.19 semifinal and Mboma 21.84 final in the women’s 200m; Silja Kosonen FIN in the women’s hammer - 71.64m; Jamaica in the women’s 4x100m – 42.94; Mixed 4x400m (new event) India in heat 1 - 3:23.36, Nigeria in heat 2 - 3:21.66 and Nigeria in final - 3:19.70).
11 area U20 records: (Mirè Reinstorf RSA in the women’s pole vault – 4.15m; Mine De Klerk RSA in the women’s discus – 53.50m; Jamaica in the women’s 4x100m – 42.94; Sasha Zhoya FRA in the 110m hurdles - 12.93 semifinal and 12.72 final; men’s 4x100m Poland with 38.93 in the heat and 38.90 in the final, South Africa and Nigeria =AR both 39.33 in the heats, South Africa 38.51 and Jamaica 38.61 in the final)
68 national U20 records.
10 national senior records.
259 personal bests.

Medal table 

Notes
 Not included in the official medal table.

Placing table
Kenya won the ranking in the placing table.

Participation
The following is a list of participating nations with the number of qualified athletes in brackets. A country without any qualified athlete could enter either one male or one female. A total 114 National Associations (plus the teams from Authorized Neutral Athletes and Athlete Refugee Team) and 897 athletes are scheduled to compete.

References

External links

 Official Site

 
World U20 Championships
World Athletics U20 Championships
World Athletics U20 Championships
Sport in Nairobi
International athletics competitions hosted by Kenya
World Athletics U20 Championships
2020 World Athletics U20 Championships
World Athletics U20 Championships